Wylie Rogers (born March 16, 1985) is an American ice hockey goaltender. He played with the Rio Grande Valley Killer Bees of the Central Hockey League.

Prior to turning professional, Rogers attended the University of Alaska Fairbanks where he played four seasons of NCAA Men's Division I Ice Hockey with the Alaska Nanooks men's ice hockey team.

Rogers played the 2010-11 season in the Netherlands with the Heerenveen Flyers.

Awards and honours

References

External links

1985 births
Living people
Alaska Nanooks men's ice hockey players
American men's ice hockey goaltenders
Heerenveen Flyers players
Rio Grande Valley Killer Bees players
Utah Grizzlies (AHL) players
Ice hockey players from Alaska
Victoria Salsa players